The First Andrews ministry was the 69th ministry of the Government of Victoria. The Labor Government, led by the Premier, Daniel Andrews, and Deputy Premier, James Merlino, was officially sworn in on 4 December 2014, following the 2014 state election, which was held on 29 November 2014. At the time of its formation, the Ministry comprised 22 ministers, five of which were members of the Victorian Legislative Council and 17 who were members of the Victorian Legislative Assembly. At the time, nine ministers were women.

The First Andrews ministry succeeded the Napthine Ministry. It was replaced by the Second Andrews ministry.

First Andrews ministry, 2014-2018

Reshuffles
Adem Somyurek stood down from his ministerial role in May 2015, and resigned as minister on 28 July 2015. He was succeeded in the ministry by Philip Dalidakis on 31 July 2015.

A reshuffle in May 2016 saw a change in responsibilities for several ministers.

On 10 June 2016, Jane Garrett, the Minister for Emergency Services, quit the Ministry, and Marlene Kairouz was brought into the Ministry on 20 June.

On 9 November 2016, Steve Herbert, the Minister for Corrections, Training and Skills and International Education, resigned from the Ministry. Gayle Tierney was appointed to the ministry and took over the corrections, training and skills portfolios. The portfolio of international education was not replaced.

On 23 August 2017, Fiona Richardson died. Natalie Hutchins took over Richardson's roles as Minister for Women and Minister for Prevention of Family Violence, but relinquished her role as Minister for Local Government to Marlene Kairouz.

On 15 October 2017, Wade Noonan resigned from the ministry. On 16 October, Ben Carroll was elevated to the ministry and took over as Minister for Industry and Employment, while Tim Pallas took over as Minister for Resources. Other ministral adjustments were also undertaken.

References

External links
 Ministers, Parliament of Victoria

Cabinets established in 2014
Victoria (Australia) ministries
2014 establishments in Australia
Australian Labor Party ministries in Victoria (Australia)
Cabinets disestablished in 2018
Ministries of Elizabeth II